Cathal Sean Hayden is a Northern Irish fiddle and banjo player of note. He was born on 13 July 1963, in the village of the Rock, County Tyrone, outside Pomeroy, an area immersed in traditional music. 

The third in the family of eight, he was born into a deep musical background. His father played the banjo and fiddle, and his mother was a pianist, while both grandfathers were fiddle players. Hayden has been All-Ireland Champion on both banjo and fiddle. He is a member of the group Four Men and a Dog whose first album, Barking Mad won the Folk Roots best new album award in 1991.

Discography
 Handed Down (1988)
 Barking Mad (1991)
 Shifting Gravel (1993)
 Doctor A's Secret Remedies (1995)
 Long Roads (1996)
 Cathal Hayden (1999)
 Maybe Tonight (2002)
 Live in Belfast (2007)
 Crossroads with Máirtín O'Connor and Seamie O'Dowd (2008)For detailed contents see irishtune.info
 Hooked on Banjo (2016)

See also
Four Men and a Dog

References

External links
 Cathal Hayden's Site
 [ Four Men and a Dog] at Allmusic
 Four Men and a Dog's Official Site

Reviews
Review by Geoff Wallis of the album Cathal Hayden
folkmusic.net review of the album Cathal Hayden
folkworld.de review of the album Cathal Hayden
Review by Geoff Wallis of the album Live in Belfast
Eddie Creaney's review of the album Live in Belfast
Review of Erne

Living people
Folk musicians from Northern Ireland
Musicians from County Tyrone
Year of birth missing (living people)
Place of birth missing (living people)